The Tomhegan Formation is a geologic formation in Somerset County, Maine. It preserves fossils dating back to the Devonian period.

See also

 List of fossiliferous stratigraphic units in Maine
 Paleontology in Maine

References

Devonian Maine
Devonian southern paleotemperate deposits